is a 1962 Japanese drama film directed by Yoshishige Yoshida, starring Mariko Okada and Hiroyuki Nagato.

Plot
Shortly before the end of World War II, young soldier Shusaku, ill with tuberculosis, arrives at Akitsu, expecting to die soon. Shinko, daughter of a widow and innkeeper, helps him to recover and invigorates his will to live. They fall in love, and although she is first willing to follow him when he suggests to commit shinjū together, they eventually let go of their plan. Shinko muses to marry Shusaku, but her mother intervenes and sends him away. Over a span of 17 years, Shusaku, now married and a father, continues to meet with Shinko, but also has affairs with other women. During their last encounters, she declares that she is now ready to die with him, but Shusaku is reluctant. When he leaves Akitsu again after a visit, Shinko, having sold the inn and being weary of life, commits suicide alone, grieved by Shusaku.

Cast
Mariko Okada as Shinko
Hiroyuki Nagato as Shusaku Kawamoto
Jūkichi Uno as Kenkichi Matsumiya
Eijirō Tōno as Priest
Kei Taguchi
Asao Koike as Osaki
Akira Nagoya as Shimamura
Sō Yamamura as Mikami
Taiji Tonoyama as Rokusuke

Production
Akitsu Springs was Mariko Okada's 100th film and the first under the direction of her future husband Yoshida.

Awards
 1962 Kinema Junpo Award for Best Actress for Mariko Okada
 1962 Mainichi Film Award for Best Actress for Mariko Okada

Home media
Akitsu Springs was released on DVD in 2013 as part of production company Shochiku's Yoshishige Yoshida DVD-Box Vol. 1.

References

External links
 

1962 films
1962 drama films
Japanese drama films
Films based on Japanese novels
Films directed by Yoshishige Yoshida
1960s Japanese films